Antônio Carlos "Bigfoot" Silva (born 14 September 1979) is a retired Brazilian professional mixed martial artist and kickboxer who formerly competed in the Heavyweight division. A professional MMA competitor from 2005 until 2022, he has competed for the UFC, Strikeforce, EliteXC, Cage Rage, Fight Nights Global, World Victory Road, K-1 HERO'S, and Cage Warriors. He is the former EliteXC Heavyweight Champion, Cage Rage World Heavyweight Champion, and Cage Warriors Super Heavyweight Champion.

Background
Originally from Brasília, Distrito Federal, Silva began training in karate at the age of four, and received his black belt at the age of 12. After 14 years of karate training, Silva transitioned to Brazilian jiu-jitsu and judo at the age of 17.

Mixed martial arts career

Club affiliation
Silva began his career with the UK-based Wolfslair MMA Academy in 2005. In 2006, after his bout with Tadas Rimkevicius, Wolfslair requested (to Silva's instructor Mario Neto) that Silva leave the team and return to Brazil. The gym claims Silva owed it over £20,000; however, Silva states that it owed him £6,000 in fighter purses for two fights, for which he was promised £3,000 each. After training with Brazilian Top Team during the dispute, Silva joined American Top Team in Coconut Creek, Florida. He also trained at the Imperial Athletics gym in Boca Raton, Florida, for his quarterfinal bout with Fedor Emelianenko in the Strikeforce World Grand Prix Heavyweight Tournament.

Early career
Silva made his professional debut in the United Kingdom against Georgian fighter Tengiz Tedoradze, who would become the Cage Rage British Heavyweight Champion two fights later. Silva was impressive in his debut, winning by TKO only 48 seconds into the fight. In his next bout, Silva made his Cage Warriors debut and won again via strikes after his opponent submitted.

Silva then made his Cage Rage debut and became the Cage Rage World Heavyweight Champion after defeating his opponent via TKO. Silva then returned to Cage Warriors to fight longtime veteran Ruben "Warpath" Villareal for the Cage Warriors Super Heavyweight Championship and won again via TKO, and became the Cage Warriors Super Heavyweight Champion. Silva followed this up with a knockout win over Lithuanian fighter Tadas Rimkevicius before making his Japanese debut for K-1 Hero's. In his debut for the organization, he defeated longtime veteran Tom Erikson via TKO and then won his next fight by knockout.

This brought Silva's record to an undefeated 7–0 with all his wins coming by TKO/KO within the first round. Silva faced Eric Pele in his first and only fight with the BodogFIGHT promotion and was handed his first career loss with a controversial TKO.

EliteXC
On 10 February 2007, Silva made his EliteXC debut at EliteXC: Destiny, against UFC veteran Wesley Correira. Silva won by TKO due to strikes in the first round.

Silva was originally scheduled to fight on the Dynamite!! USA card as a representative of EliteXC. He was to face Jonathan Wiezorek, but the California State Athletic Commission (CSAC) discovered a benign tumor on his pituitary gland in his pre-fight medicals and refused to license the fighter. As a result, Silva underwent brain surgery that summer in order to have the tumor removed.

Post-surgery, Silva finally faced Jonathan Wiezorek at EliteXC: Renegade in November 2007. He won the fight by a rear-naked choke in the first round. His next victory came by split decision (28–29, 29–28, and 30–27) over former UFC Heavyweight Champion Ricco Rodriguez.

On 26 July 2008, Silva won the EliteXC Heavyweight Championship, with a second-round TKO win over UFC veteran Justin Eilers. Silva later tested positive for the anabolic steroid Boldenone, and was suspended for one year and fined $2,500 by the California State Athletic Commission. According to Silva's manager, Alex Davis, the positive test was caused by Silva's use of Novedex, a testosterone-booster he takes to raise his low testosterone levels (a symptom of his acromegaly). "He has to treat it", said Davis. "He spends between $6,000 and $8,000 a month just on medicine for it. He needs to be able to keep fighting to make a living. If it's between Antônio's health and pleasing the athletic commission, we have to choose his health."

Sengoku
Soon after, Silva signed on to fight at World Victory Road Presents: Sengoku no Ran 2009. He was advised not to fight in Japan by the California State Athletic Commission. He ignored this advice, and continued to claim that he had not used steroids. At 4 January 2009 event, he defeated Yoshihiro "KISS" Nakao by TKO when Nakao suffered a knee injury in the first round.

At Sengoku 10 he fought Jim York, winning by submission in the first round. With both fighters looking tentative on the feet, Silva took York down once, but was stood up by the referee. Later in the round, he took York down again, assuming the half-guard position and landing effective hammerfists and punches, before moving into an arm-triangle choke from the side control position to secure victory.

Strikeforce
On 7 November 2009, Silva suffered the second loss of his career, losing a unanimous decision to Fabrício Werdum at Strikeforce: Fedor vs. Rogers. After dominating the first round, Silva fractured his left hand in the beginning of the second.

Silva defeated former UFC Heavyweight Champion Andrei Arlovski on 15 May 2010, at Strikeforce: Heavy Artillery, via unanimous decision.

He was scheduled to face Valentijn Overeem on 4 Dec, but Overeem suffered an injury and withdrew from the fight. He was replaced by Mike Kyle. Kyle knocked down Silva in the first round with a punch, but Silva survived Kyle's ground and pound and recovered. In the second round, Silva mounted Kyle and forced a TKO stoppage with punches.

Silva defeated Fedor Emelianenko in the quarterfinal round of the 2011 Strikeforce World Grand Prix Heavyweight Tournament, via TKO (doctor stoppage) between the second and third rounds. He was expected to meet Alistair Overeem in the semifinals, but Overeem withdrew from the fight due to injury. He was replaced by one of the tournament alternates, Daniel Cormier. Cormier knocked Silva out with standing punches at 3:56 of round 1.

Ultimate Fighting Championship
On 7 January 2012, Antônio Rodrigo Nogueira told "Portal do Vale Tudo" Silva had signed a UFC contract. Silva was scheduled to debut against Roy Nelson on 26 May 2012 at UFC 146, but was rescheduled to face Cain Velasquez instead. Velasquez defeated Silva by TKO in the first round.

Silva faced Travis Browne on 5 October 2012 at UFC on FX 5. Early in the fight Browne injured his hamstring, limiting his movement. Silva capitalized on Browne's limited mobility by backing him against the cage. After a big right sent Browne to the canvas, Silva finished him off with strikes on the ground for a first-round TKO victory.

Silva next faced Alistair Overeem on 2 February 2013 at UFC 156. Leading up to the fight, Overeem was dismissive of Silva's skills, claiming he was better than his opponent in every aspect of MMA. Despite being a significant underdog and losing the first and second rounds, Silva won the fight via KO in the third round.  The win also earned Silva his first Knockout of the Night honor.

Silva faced Cain Velasquez in a rematch for the UFC Heavyweight Championship on 25 May 2013 at UFC 160. Silva was rocked with a right hand early into the fight and finished again via TKO in the first round.

Silva faced Mark Hunt on 7 December 2013 at UFC Fight Night 33 in the main event. It was a back-and-forth affair that saw both men trade the advantage over five full rounds. The result was a majority draw (48–47 Hunt, 47–47, and 47–47). Post-fight, Dana White said the bout won Fight of the Night and, despite the draw result, both men would receive their win bonuses. Silva forfeited his win money and $50,000 Fight of the Night bonus to Hunt after failing a post-fight test for elevated testosterone (he had been undergoing UFC-approved testosterone replacement therapy). He was suspended for nine months, retroactive to the date of the fight.

Silva faced Andrei Arlovski in a rematch on 13 September 2014 at UFC Fight Night 51. He lost the fight via knockout in the first round. Following this fight, Silva returned to the hospital for surgery to remove a pituitary gland tumor - which causes his acromegaly - that had reemerged.  The surgery was successful and he expects to return to fighting in 2015.

Silva was expected to face Frank Mir on 28 February 2015 at UFC 184. However, the bout with Mir was moved up a week and instead served as event headliner for UFC Fight Night 61. Silva lost the fight via knockout in the first round, as Mir dropped Silva with a left hook and finished him with a barrage of ground and pound.

Silva faced Soa Palelei on 1 August 2015 at UFC 190. He won the fight by TKO in the second round.

A rematch with Mark Hunt took place on 15 November 2015 at UFC 193. Silva lost the fight via TKO in the first round.

Silva next faced Stefan Struve on 8 May 2016 at UFC Fight Night 87. Silva lost the bout via knockout in the first round as he was stunned by a right hook on the chin followed with a knee to the body and multiple elbows to the side of his head.

Silva fought Roy Nelson on 24 September 2016 at UFC Fight Night 95. He lost the fight by knockout in the second round. Subsequently, he was released from the UFC.

Post-UFC career
After the release from UFC, Silva fought Ivan Shtyrkov in Russia on 18 November 2016. He lost the fight via unanimous decision.

He then faced Vitaly Minakov at Fight Nights Global 68 on 2 June 2017. He lost the fight via knockout in the second round.

On 28 July 2020, it was announced that Silva had signed a contract with Taura MMA. He was expected to make his promotional debut against Brett Martin at Taura MMA 11 on 30 October 2020. However, the bout was cancelled on the fight week.

Subsequently, Silva signed with Arena Fighting Championship and was expected to face Chris Barnett at AFC 2 on 12 December 2020, but the whole event was postponed due to multiple COVID-19 cases.

Silva made his return to MMA against Quentin Domingos on 13 June 2021 at Megdan Fighting 9. He lost the fight via TKO in the second round.

Silva was scheduled to headline Gamebred FC 2 against Alex Nicholson on September 11, 2021. However, his prevailing contract with Eagle Fighting Championship prevented him from competing at the event and he was replaced by Jonathan Ivey. In turn, Silva was scheduled to face Davit Modzmanashvili at an EFC event on September 26, 2021. However, Bigfoot Silva pulled out of the bout.

Silva was scheduled to face Tyrone Spong on January 28, 2022, at EFC 44. However, he was pulled from the bout to be replaced by Sergei Kharitonov.

Silva returned against Oleg Popov at MMA Series 53 on June 24, 2022. He lost the bout, getting knocked out 15 seconds into the 2nd round.

On December 27, 2022, Silva announced his retirement from MMA competition. After retirement, Silva will continue his involvement in the sport as a grappling and BJJ coach.

Kickboxing
In August 2017 Silva signed with Glory Kickboxing, and made his debut against Rico Verhoeven at Glory 46 on 14 October 2017 in Guangzhou, China.
 After being dominated by arguably the No. 1 heavyweight kickboxer of the time, Silva was knocked down by a headkick in the second round. The referee stopped the fight less than a minute later officially ruling the match a TKO win for Verhoeven.

Silva was scheduled to challenge Greg Tony for World Kickboxing Network Super Heavyweight title at the final day of WKN World Cup 2019 on 30 November 2019 in Auckland, New Zealand. The fight was cancelled due to withdrawal of Silva, who wasn't medically cleared after suffering the defeat by knockout in his previous bout.

Bare-knuckle boxing
On 16 August 2019, it was announced that Silva had signed a contract with the Bare Knuckle Fighting Championship. Subsequently, on 28 August 2019, it was announced that Silva would make his promotional debut headlining BKFC 8 against fellow UFC veteran Gabriel Gonzaga on 19 October 2019. He lost the fight by knockout in the second round.

Personal life
In late 2020, Silva adopted twin brothers in his native Brazil.

Championships and accomplishments
Mixed martial arts
MMA Lineal championship
Heavyweight Lineal Championship (One time)
EliteXC
EliteXC Heavyweight Championship (One time, first, last)
Cage Rage
Cage Rage World Heavyweight Championship (One time, last)
Cage Warriors
Cage Warriors Super Heavyweight Championship (One time)
One Successful Title Defense
Strikeforce
2011 Strikeforce Heavyweight Grand Prix semifinalist
 Ultimate Fighting Championship
 Knockout of the Night (One time) 
 Fight of the Night (forfeited after testing positive for elevated testosterone)

Mixed martial arts record

|-
| Loss
| align=center| 19–14 (1)
|Oleg Popov 
|KO (punch)
|MMA Series 53
|
|align=center|2
|align=center|0:15
|Moscow, Russia
|
|-
| Loss
| align=center| 19–13 (1)
| Quentin Domingos
| TKO (punches)
| Megdan Fighting 9: Under the Bright Sky
| 
| align=center|2
| align=center|0:30
| Šabac, Serbia
| 
|-
| Loss
| align=center| 19–12 (1)
| Vitaly Minakov
| KO (punches)
| Fight Nights Global 68: Pavlovich vs. Mokhnatkin 
| 
| align=center|2
| align=center|1:37
| St. Petersburg, Russia
| 
|-
|Loss
|align=center|19–11 (1)
|Ivan Shtyrkov
| Decision (unanimous)
|Titov Boxing Promotion: Shtyrkov vs. Silva
|
|align=center| 3
|align=center| 5:00
|Yekaterinburg, Russia
|
|-
|Loss
|align=center|19–10 (1)
|Roy Nelson
|KO (punches)
|UFC Fight Night: Cyborg vs. Lansberg
|
|align=center| 2
|align=center| 4:10
|Brasília, Distrito Federal, Brazil
| 
|-
|Loss
|align=center|19–9 (1)
|Stefan Struve
|KO (elbows)
|UFC Fight Night: Overeem vs. Arlovski
|
|align=center|1
|align=center|0:16
|Rotterdam, Netherlands
|
|-
| Loss
|align=center|19–8 (1)
|Mark Hunt
| TKO (punches)
|UFC 193
|
|align=center|1 
|align=center|3:41
|Melbourne, Australia
|
|-
| Win
| align=center| 19–7 (1)
| Soa Palelei
| TKO (punches)
| UFC 190
| 
| align=center| 2
| align=center| 0:41
| Rio de Janeiro, Rio de Janeiro, Brazil
|
|-
| Loss
| align=center| 18–7 (1)
| Frank Mir
| KO (punches and elbows)
| UFC Fight Night: Bigfoot vs. Mir
| 
| align=center| 1
| align=center| 1:40
| Porto Alegre, Rio Grande do Sul, Brazil
|
|-
| Loss
| align=center| 18–6 (1)
| Andrei Arlovski
| KO (punches)
| UFC Fight Night: Bigfoot vs. Arlovski
| 
| align=center| 1
| align=center| 2:59
| Brasília, Distrito Federal, Brazil
| 
|-
| NC
| align=center| 18–5 (1)
| Mark Hunt
| NC (overturned)
| UFC Fight Night: Hunt vs. Bigfoot
| 
| align=center| 5
| align=center| 5:00
| Brisbane, Australia
|
|-
| Loss
| align=center| 18–5
| Cain Velasquez
| TKO (punches)
| UFC 160
| 
| align=center| 1
| align=center| 1:21
| Las Vegas, Nevada, United States
| 
|-
| Win
| align=center| 18–4
| Alistair Overeem
| KO (punches)
| UFC 156
| 
| align=center| 3
| align=center| 0:25
| Las Vegas, Nevada, United States 
| 
|-
| Win
| align=center| 17–4
| Travis Browne
| TKO (punches)
| UFC on FX: Browne vs. Bigfoot
| 
| align=center| 1
| align=center| 3:27
| Minneapolis, Minnesota, United States 
| 
|-
| Loss
| align=center| 16–4
| Cain Velasquez
| TKO (punches)
| UFC 146
| 
| align=center| 1
| align=center| 3:36
| Las Vegas, Nevada, United States
| 
|-
| Loss
| align=center| 16–3
| Daniel Cormier
| KO (punches)
| Strikeforce: Barnett vs. Kharitonov
| 
| align=center| 1
| align=center| 3:56
| Cincinnati, Ohio, United States
| 
|-
| Win
| align=center| 16–2
| Fedor Emelianenko
| TKO (doctor stoppage)
| Strikeforce: Fedor vs. Silva
| 
| align=center| 2
| align=center| 5:00
| East Rutherford, New Jersey, United States
| 
|-
| Win
| align=center| 15–2
| Mike Kyle
| KO (punches)
| Strikeforce: Henderson vs. Babalu II
| 
| align=center| 2
| align=center| 2:49
| St. Louis, Missouri, United States
| 
|-
| Win
| align=center| 14–2
| Andrei Arlovski
| Decision (unanimous)
| Strikeforce: Heavy Artillery
| 
| align=center| 3
| align=center| 5:00
| St. Louis, Missouri, United States
| 
|-
| Loss
| align=center| 13–2
| Fabrício Werdum
| Decision (unanimous)
| Strikeforce: Fedor vs. Rogers
| 
| align=center| 3
| align=center| 5:00
| Hoffman Estates, Illinois, United States
| 
|-
| Win
| align=center| 13–1
| Jim York
| Submission (arm-triangle choke)
| Sengoku 10
| 
| align=center| 1
| align=center| 3:51
| Saitama, Japan
| 
|-
| Win
| align=center| 12–1
| Yoshihiro Nakao
| TKO (knee injury)
| World Victory Road Presents: Sengoku no Ran 2009
| 
| align=center| 1
| align=center| 1:42
| Saitama, Japan
| 
|-
| Win
| align=center| 11–1
| Justin Eilers
| TKO (knees and punches)
| EliteXC: Unfinished Business
| 
| align=center| 2
| align=center| 0:19
| Stockton, California, United States
| 
|-
| Win
| align=center| 10–1
| Ricco Rodriguez
| Decision (split)
| EliteXC: Street Certified
| 
| align=center| 3
| align=center| 5:00
| Miami, Florida, United States
| 
|-
| Win
| align=center| 9–1
| Jonathan Wiezorek
| Submission (rear-naked choke)
| EliteXC: Renegade
| 
| align=center| 1
| align=center| 3:12
| Corpus Christi, Texas, United States
| 
|-
| Win
| align=center| 8–1
| Wesley Correira
| TKO (flying knee and punches)
| EliteXC: Destiny
| 
| align=center| 1
| align=center| 3:49
| Southaven, Mississippi, United States
|
|-
|Loss
| align=center| 7–1
| Eric Pele
| TKO (punches)
| BodogFight: USA vs. Russia
| 
| align=center| 1
| align=center| 2:40
| Vancouver, British Columbia, Canada
| 
|-
| Win
| align=center| 7–0
| Georgy Kaysinov
| KO (punch)
| Hero's 7
| 
| align=center| 1
| align=center| 1:08
| Yokohama, Japan
|
|-
| Win
| align=center| 6–0
| Tom Erikson
| TKO (punches)
| Hero's 5
| 
| align=center| 1
| align=center| 2:49
| Tokyo, Japan
|
|-
| Win
| align=center| 5–0
| Tadas Rimkevicius
| TKO (punches)
| CWFC: Strike Force 5
| 
| align=center| 1
| align=center| 3:22
| Coventry, England
| 
|-
| Win
| align=center| 4–0
| Ruben Villareal
| TKO (punches)
| CWFC: Strike Force 4
| 
| align=center| 1
| align=center| 3:07
| Coventry, England
| 
|-
| Win
| align=center| 3–0
| Rafael Carino
| TKO (corner stoppage)
| Cage Rage 12
| 
| align=center| 1
| align=center| 2:55
| London, England
| 
|-
| Win
| align=center| 2–0
| Marcus Tchinda
| TKO (submission to punches)
| CWFC: Strike Force
| 
| align=center| 1
| align=center| 3:03
| Coventry, England
| 
|-
| Win
| align=center| 1–0
| Tengiz Tedoradze
| TKO (punches)
| UKMMAC 10: Slugfest
| 
| align=center| 1
| align=center| 0:48
| Colchester, England
|

Kickboxing record

Professional boxing record

{|class="wikitable" style="text-align:center; font-size:95%"
|-
!
!Result
!Record
!Opponent
!Type
!Round, time
!Date
!Location
!Notes
|-
|1
|Loss
|align=center|0–1
|Viacheslav Datsik
|
|2 (4), 0:44 
|July 8, 2022
|align=left|

Bare knuckle record

|- 
|Loss
|align=center|0–1
|Gabriel Gonzaga
|KO (punches)
|Bare Knuckle FC 8
|
|align=center|2
|align=center|1:50
|Tampa, Florida, United States
|
|-

See also
 List of male mixed martial artists
 List of male kickboxers

Footnotes

External links
 

1979 births
Brazilian male mixed martial artists
Heavyweight mixed martial artists
Super heavyweight mixed martial artists
Brazilian male kickboxers
Heavyweight kickboxers
Mixed martial artists utilizing Shotokan
Mixed martial artists utilizing judo
Mixed martial artists utilizing Brazilian jiu-jitsu
Bare-knuckle boxers
Brazilian male karateka
Brazilian male judoka
Brazilian practitioners of Brazilian jiu-jitsu
People awarded a black belt in Brazilian jiu-jitsu
People with acromegaly
Living people
Sportspeople from Brasília
Brazilian sportspeople in doping cases
Doping cases in mixed martial arts
Ultimate Fighting Championship male fighters